Trials of the Diaspora: A History of Anti-Semitism in England is a 2010 book by British lawyer Anthony Julius. It is a description of a strain within the history of England that is discriminatory against Jews.  The book argues that anti-Zionism in England developed out of antisemitism in the United Kingdom and utilizes many of the same antisemitic tropes in its arguments.

Reception

The American literary critic Harold Bloom, writing in The New York Times, praised the book as "a strong, somber book on an appalling subject: the long squalor of Jew-hatred in a supposedly enlightened, humane, liberal society". In Bloom's opinion,  Julius is "a truth-teller, and authentic enough to stand against the English literary and academic establishment, which essentially opposes the right of the state of Israel to exist, while indulging in the humbuggery that its anti-Zionism is not anti-Semitism," and lauds the "fierce relevance" of the book at a time of rising anti-Semitism. Jonathan Freedland in The New Republic describes  Trials of the Diaspora as "magisterial and definitive history of a thousand years of anti-Semitism in England."

By contrast, British historian Dominic Sandbrook wrote in the London Daily Telegraph: "Many readers... will part company with Julius in his final chapters, where he effectively suggests that criticism of Israel is inextricably bound up with anti-Semitism"; and concluded: "This strident tub-thumping is unworthy of such a learned author, and makes an unsatisfying conclusion to an otherwise thoughtful and impressive book."

British writer Antony Lerman, former researcher for the Institute of Jewish Affairs, reviewing the book for The Guardian found Julius' project in writing this work 'bankrupt', 'confused' and 'malign' in its relentless conflation of anti-Zionism and general criticism of Israel  - including its treatment of Palestinians - with anti-Semitism, the meaning of which in Julius' book is in part 'incomprehensible' and leaves the reader thinking that, for Julius, anti-Semitism is whatever he says it may be.

Geoffrey Alderman described Trials of the Diaspora as "set(ting) down several markers against which all future discussion of anti-Jewish prejudice – not just in England or the UK – will need to be measured".  Among these are the idea that antisemitism is rooted in Christianity, and the blood libel was a largely English creation; that anti-Zionism is, in Alderman's words, "nothing more than a fig leaf" pretending to cover the ugly reality of racist, anti-semitic anti-Zionism; thirdly, that the British Left has a long and shameful history of antisemitism; and, lastly, that what Alderman calls the "toxic brew" of antisemitic anti-Zionism in Britain has become so dominant that public discourse and even university classrooms are now dominated by "history... rewritten as fiction" serving "to delegitimise the Jewish state and thus to denigrate and defame the Jewish people. And that is what anti-Semitism is all about".

References

2010 non-fiction books
History books about England
History books about Jews and Judaism